Riordan Mansion State Historic Park is an historic site in Flagstaff, Arizona, bordering Northern Arizona University.

Origin 
This park features the duplex home of Timothy and Michael Riordan, lumber baron brothers who married sisters, Caroline and Elizabeth Metz. The brothers were members of an important Arizona Territorial family who played a role in the development of Flagstaff and northern Arizona and were involved in lumber, railroads, cattle, banking, and politics.

Cooperatively the Riordan brothers built their thirteen thousand square foot mansion in 1904 while Arizona was still a territory. The home consisted of two similar six thousand square foot wings for each family, connected by a large common room.

Charles Whittlesey was the architect for the Riordan homes. He also was the architect for the El Tovar Hotel at the Grand Canyon. Architectural similarities between the structures can be found in the massive stone arches at porch corners as well as exterior elements that reflect the surrounding landscape like log planks, wood shingles, and native stone.

Park history 

The public opening of the Park was held on August 4, 1983, and only included the Timothy A. Riordan (east) side of the house.  This was the results of cooperative efforts of the family owner, Robert Chambers, who had died in 1980, and the Arizona State Park board members and personnel.  On April 27, 2002, the Michael J. Riordan (west) side was opened for self-guided tours.

The park was scheduled to close on February 22, 2010, for an undetermined amount of time due to state budget cutting, but its contract with the Arizona State Parks system was renewed for another three years under the condition it is self-funded. The Riordan Action Network Group, a team of local volunteers fund-raises to keep the park open and pay the staff salaries. The park now maintains very few staff and relies on volunteers to maintain the mansion and provide educational tours.

References

External links 
 Riordan Mansion State Historic Park

State parks of Arizona
Museums in Flagstaff, Arizona
Historic house museums in Arizona
Parks in Coconino County, Arizona
Houses in Coconino County, Arizona
Houses completed in 1904
Houses on the National Register of Historic Places in Arizona
National Register of Historic Places in Flagstaff, Arizona
1978 establishments in Arizona
Museums established in 1978
Protected areas established in 1978